Ayesha Leti-I'iga (born 3 January 1999) is a New Zealand rugby union player. She plays for Hurricanes Poua in the Super Rugby Aupiki competition, and for Wellington in the Farah Palmer Cup. She also represents New Zealand internationally and was a member of their 2021 Rugby World Cup champion squad.

Rugby career 
Leti-I’iga made her debut for Wellington in 2015 at the age of 16 and since then has scored 51 tries in 38 games. She also plays for Wellington club Oriental Rongotai and has scored 159 tries in 62 games for them.

2018–2019 
Leti-I’iga made her test debut for New Zealand on 3 November 2018, she came off the bench against the United States at Chicago. She featured in all of the games at the 2019 Women's Rugby Super Series in San Diego. She also helped the Black Ferns maintain their unbeaten record against Australia later that year.

2021 
Leti-I’iga was a standout for the Black Ferns in their unsuccessful tour of England and France in 2021, she played in three of the four test matches.

2022 
Leti-I’iga signed with the Hurricanes Poua for the inaugural season of Super Rugby Aupiki.

Leti-I’iga was selected for the Black Ferns squad for the 2022 Pacific Four Series. She scored a brace of tries against the Wallaroos. Leti-I’iga scored a hat trick in the final match of the series against the Eagles. She was recalled into the Black Ferns squad for the August test series against Australia for the Laurie O'Reilly Cup.

In September 2022, she made the Black Ferns 32-player squad for the deferred 2021 Rugby World Cup. She scored a try in the final pool game against Scotland. In the World Cup final she scored a brace of tries against England and helped the Black Ferns win their sixth title.

2023 
Leti-I’iga re-signed with Hurricanes Poua for their second season.

References

External links 

 Black Ferns Profile

1999 births
Living people
New Zealand women's international rugby union players
New Zealand female rugby union players
Rugby union players from Tauranga